Second Stage Theater is a theater company founded in 1979 by Robyn Goodman and Carole Rothman and located in Manhattan, New York City. It produces both new plays and revivals of contemporary American plays by new playwrights and established writers. The company has two off-Broadway theaters, their main stage, the Tony Kiser Theater at 305 West 43rd Street on the corner of Eighth Avenue near the Theater District, and the McGinn/Cazale Theater at 2162 Broadway at 76th Street on the Upper West Side. In April 2015, the company bought the Helen Hayes Theater, a Broadway theater.

History
Robyn Goodman and Carole Rothman founded Second Stage Theater in 1979, to produce "second stagings" of contemporary American plays, later expanding to new works as well. In 1982 they secured a permanent venue with the McGinn–Cazale Theater. In 1999, the company opened a new 296-seat theater at 43rd Street, designed by Dutch architect Rem Koolhaas. The Second Stage Theater Uptown series was inaugurated in 2002 to showcase the work of emerging artists at the McGinn/Cazale Theater at 76th Street.

Helen Hayes Theater
Second Stage finalized its acquisition of the Helen Hayes Theater, a 597-seat Broadway theater located at 240 West 44th Street, in April 2015 for $24.7 million. The first Second Stage production at the Hayes Theater was Lobby Hero, by Kenneth Lonergan, starring Michael Cera and Chris Evans during early 2018, after renovations and upgrades. Second Stage is one of only four nonprofit theater companies that own and operate theaters on Broadway. The company continues to lease and operate its original theaters on the Upper West Side and in Midtown Manhattan.

Awards and honors 
The company's more than 125 citations include six 2016 Tony Awards for Dear Evan Hansen including Best Musical, Best Book of a Musical (Steven Levenson), Best Original Score (Pasek & Paul), Best Performance by a Leading Actor in a Musical (Ben Platt), Best Performance by an Actress in a Featured Role in a Musical (Rachel Bay Jones), and Best Orchestrations (Alex Lacamoire), three 2009 Tony Awards for Next to Normal including Best Performance by a Leading Actress in a Musical (Alice Ripley), Best Original Score Written for the Theatre (Tom Kitt and Brian Yorkey), and Best Orchestrations (Tom Kitt and Michael Starobin), the 2007 Tony Award for Best Actress in a Play (Julie White) for The Little Dog Laughed, 2002 Tony Award for Best Director of a Play (Mary Zimmerman for Metamorphoses), the 2002 Lucille Lortel Award for Outstanding Body of Work, 28 Obie Awards including a 2017 Special Citation by the Obies for Anna Deavere Smith's Notes from the Field, seven Outer Critics Circle Awards, two Clarence Derwent Awards, 12 Drama Desk Awards, nine Theatre World Awards, 17 Lucille Lortel Awards, the Drama Critics' Circle Award and 23 AUDELCO Awards. In 2010 Next to Normal received the Pulitzer Prize for Drama.

In the following table, the seasons correspond to the year of the play's production; the ceremonies are traditionally held in the same or the following year as the production.

References
Notes

External links
 
 Lortel Archives
 
 

Off-Broadway
Theatre companies in New York City
Broadway theatre